Jaroslav Suchý (born 3 February 1971) is a Czech former competitive figure skater. Internationally, he represented Czechoslovakia until its dissolution and then the Czech Republic. He is the 1995 Czech national champion. His highest senior ISU Championship result was 13th at the 1993 European Championships in Helsinki, Finland. He began skating in 1977 and retired from competition in 1997.

Suchý graduated from Gymnázium třída Kapitána Jaroše in 1989 and from Masaryk University in 1995. He is involved in Brno municipal politics as a member of KDU–ČSL.

Competitive highlights

References

External links 
 

1971 births
Czech male single skaters
Czechoslovak male single skaters
Living people
Figure skaters from Brno